Casey Donovan (born 13 May 1988) is an Australian singer, songwriter, actress, theatre actress and author, best known for winning the second season of the singing competition show Australian Idol in 2004. She won the competition at age 16, becoming the series' youngest winner. In 2017, Donovan won the third series of I'm a Celebrity...Get Me Out of Here. Donovan also hosted the NITV music show Fusion with Casey Donovan.

Early life

Casey Donovan was born in Condell Park, New South Wales, of indigenous descent to a family that included several relatives with musical careers, including her father, who along with his brothers are members of country band The Donovans. After her parents divorced, her mother and siblings moved in with stepfather Norm Axford. Growing up, Casey was always interested in singing and performing. Contact with the Donovan cousins fostered interest in both singing and playing guitar, which led to busking on the streets of Tamworth during the Country Music Festival when she was ten. Casey's musical interest was noticed at Bass Hill Public School and Georges Hall Primary but was not enough to have any public notice. It was not until attending Condell Park High that her talent became noticed and was supported especially by both her mother and stepfather.

Career

2004–2006: Australian Idol and For You

In 2004, Donovan transferred to the Australian Institute of Music in Sydney and auditioned for the second season of Australian Idol, singing Kasey Chambers' "A Million Tears". During the series, Donovan won a Deadly Award for Most Promising New Talent in Music. In November, Donovan was announced the winner of Idol over favourite Anthony Callea. Her success was marred by a typographical mistake by Australian Idol sponsor Telstra, in a half-page nationally run newspaper advertisement including what was assumed to be her website. The link was a memorial for the late American pornography actor of the same name. Telstra apologised for the error.

Donovan released her debut single "Listen with Your Heart" on 29 November 2004, which debuted at number 1 and was certified triple platinum. On 13 December 2004, Donovan released her debut album, For You, which debuted at number 2 and was certified double platinum.

Australian Idol performances

In February 2005, Donovan released "What's Going On" which peaked at number 18 on the ARIA Charts. At the Deadly Awards 2005, Donovan won Single Release of the Year for "Listen with Your Heart" and Artist of the Year. At the ARIA Music Awards of 2005, Donovan was nominated for Highest Selling Single, losing to Anthony Callea's "The Prayer". In 2006, Donovan was dropped from Sony BMG.

2007–2016: Post-Idol career
In 2008, independently released the extended play Eye 2 Eye.

While starring in the successful concept show Women of Soul, Donovan was approached by Rhoda Roberts for the theatrical production of Miracle in Brisbane for the Brisbane Festival in October 2009.

In 2010, Donovan was cast in the role of Cynthia in a musical stage production of The Sapphires, which saw the show tour Australia throughout the first half of 2010. Donovan won praise from the critics for her role in the production, which was presented by Company B Belvoir and Black Swan State Theatre Company. Donovan went on to take home the Best Supporting Actress award at the 4th Daegu International Music Festival Awards while on tour with the production in South Korea in July 2010.

Donovan returned to music with the release of her single "Big, Beautiful & Sexy" written with songwriter Beau Golden, released in August 2010. A Facebook support group named for the song grew to over 10,000 fans shortly after release. Prior to the song's release, Donovan herself lost over 20 kg and continued her support of larger men and women. Donovan went on to release another single in November 2010 titled "Last Regret", which gained some commercial airplay.

In December 2010, Donovan was nominated for two awards at the 2010 Sydney Theatre Awards for "Newcomer" and "Supporting Actress", continuing to receive praise and recognition from the industry for her work in The Sapphires. Although she auditioned for a role in the 2011 movie version, Donovan was not cast.

2011 saw Donovan reprise her role of Cynthia Macrae in another tour of The Sapphires. The tour ran during February in ACT and NSW, and was followed by two weeks in the UK in March.

In August/September 2011, Donovan created the role of Mama Cass in the world premiere of new musical Flowerchildren – The Mamas & the Papas Story written by Peter Fitzpatrick and produced by Australian company Magnormos. She was joined by Matt Hetherington as John Phillips, Laura Fitzpatrick as Michelle Phillips, and Dan Humphris as Denny Doherty.

Donovan also played several roles in Shakespeare's As You Like It at Sydney's Belvoir Street Theatre.

In 2016, Donovan played Killer Queen in We Will Rock You.

2017–2018: I'm a Celebrity, TV advertisements and "Lonely"
In January 2017, Donovan was revealed as a celebrity contestant on the third season of the Australian version of I'm a Celebrity...Get Me Out of Here!. On 13 March 2017, Donovan won the series and was announced as the first ever Queen of the Jungle. In April 2017, Donovan became the face of the Coles Supermarket "Down down" campaign. On 23 April 2017, Donovan performed an acoustic version of David Bowie's "Heroes" at the 2017 Logie Awards in which she received a standing ovation.
In May 2017 the Coles, "Down Down" campaign was refreshed with Casey performing a disco version of the advertisement.
Donovan released her first single in 7 years, "Lonely" on 19 May 2017 and Off the Grid & Somewhere in Between EP in August 2017.

She performed on New Year's Eve 2017 in Sydney, singing "Lady Marmalade", "Crazy Little Thing Called Love" and "Nutbush City Limits".

2019–present: Chicago, Australia Decides, and The Space podcast
In 2019 Donovan starred as "Mama Morton" in the Australian revival of the musical, Chicago, receiving positive reviews.

In November 2019, Donovan was announced as a participant in Eurovision - Australia Decides; in an attempt to represent Australia in the Eurovision Song Contest 2020. She performed the track "Proud" in the national final on 8 February 2020 and placed second.

In 2020, Donovan became a host on The Space podcast. It is listed in the "Health & Fitness" category through Nova Podcasts on iTunes. Two new short 3- to 4-minute mini-episodes are posted each day by Donovan. It is described as a "mindfulness podcast" and a "mini escape each morning and evening with short (and cringe-free) meditations, motivations, and tips on how to improve your day" 'The Space' is constantly in the Top 3 mindfulness and wellbeing Australian podcast category.

Casey has fast become a must-see and hear performer at the annual New Year's Eve gala on the foreshore of the Sydney Opera House with performances in 2017 (Lady Marmalade, Nutbush City Limits, Think, Don't Stop Me Now) 2019 (Rolling In the Deep, I Will Survive, If I Could Turn Back Time, Purple Rain), 2020 (September, 9 To 5, So Caught Up,) and 2021 (Ain't No Mountain High Enough, Higher Love, Finally, Born This Way) and Australia Day performances at the iconic location in 2021 (Two Strong Hearts, Are You Gonna Be My Girl, Thunderstruck) and 2022 (Age of Reason, In The Summertime) as well as co-hosting, all televised nationally on ABC TV and iView.

In 2021, Casey, was cast as lunatic ‘Luna Keys’ in the hit TV show How To Stay Married, alongside Peter Helliar and Lisa McCune, where she was able to peel back the layers of character acting and show her diverse talent and delivery to wide acclaim.

Throughout the pandemic in 2020/ 2021, Casey has not only entertained her fans, but nourished her own musical soul, with a Facebook Live performance BluesDay Tuesday, where each week, she acoustically performs some of her favourite songs but also fan requests.  “Bluesday is a show that uses music for healing, thought, interaction, distraction, storytelling whether it be m music or someone else's” says Casey.  With thousands tuning in each week, Casey has decided to do a short mini tour in her home State of Victoria in October & November 2021.

In 2021 Casey took on the hosting role alongside Noni Hazelhurst and Kurt Fearnley of SBS TV's What Does Australia Really Think?, a series that reveals what Australia thinks about disability, obesity, and old age through emotional personal stories, confronting social experiments and a nationwide survey.

2022 sees Casey return to the stage as a lead in the hit musical 9 TO 5, playing the role of Judy Bernly (Jane Fonda role from the hit movie) opening at the Capitol Theatre Sydney in February, then around the country throughout the year.

Casey is also currently working on new music to be released in 2022 and her ‘Bluesday’ Tour on the East Coast of Australia.

In 2023, it was announced that Casey would play the role of Angelique/Nurse in the Melbourne production of & Juliet at the Regent Theatre.

Personal life
Donovan lends her name and support to a number of charitable and non-profit organisations. Donovan is an Ambassador for APRA AMCOS and an Advocate for the National Centre of Indigenous Excellence.

From 2004, Donovan was the victim of a six-year-long hoax telephone relationship with a persona named Campbell, constructed by a woman named Olga.

In 2023, Donovan announced she was in a relationship with a woman, whom she met on a dating app during the COVID-19 lockdowns.

Discography

Studio albums

Extended plays

Singles

Television

Awards and nominations

ARIA Music Awards

! Lost to
|-
| rowspan="2"| 2005
| For You
| Highest Selling Album
| 
| Missy Higgins - The Sound Of White 
|-
| "Listen with Your Heart"
| Highest Selling Single
| 
| Anthony Callea - "The Prayer"
|-

Deadly Awards
The Deadly Awards, (commonly known simply as The Deadlys), was an annual celebration of Australian Aboriginal and Torres Strait Islander achievement in music, sport, entertainment and community. They ran from 1996 to 2013.

|-
| Deadly Awards 2004
| "herself"
| Most Promising New Talent in Music
| 
|-
| rowspan="2"| Deadly Awards 2005
| "herself"
|  Artist of the Year
| 
|-
| "Listen with Your Heart"
| Single Release of the Year
| 
|-

References

External links
 Official Myspace
 Official Website

Living people
1988 births
21st-century Australian singers
21st-century Australian women singers
Australian child singers
Australian women pop singers
Australian Idol winners
Australian Institute of Music alumni
I'm a Celebrity...Get Me Out of Here! (Australian TV series) winners
I'm a Celebrity...Get Me Out of Here! (Australian TV series) participants
Indigenous Australian actresses
Indigenous Australian musicians
Singers from Sydney
Donovan musical family